Thiya Loaibaa Dhurah is a 2018 Maldivian romantic film written and directed by Mariyam Moosa. Produced under Techno Media, the film stars Ahmed Azmeel and Maleeha Waheed in pivotal roles. The film was released on 21 April 2018. The entire film was shot in Sri Lanka.

Cast 
 Ahmed Azmeel as Amir
 Maleeha Waheed as Leen
 Ahmed Aman as Faiz
 Mariyam Shahuza as Shiu
 Sujeetha Abdulla
 Arifa Ibrahim

Development
In early 2017, it was revealed that Mariyam Moosa was ready for her directorial debut with the film Thiya Loaibaa Dhurah. Moosa has previously penned stories for films; Majubooru Loabi, Qurubaanee and Sirru, where she worked as the assistant director for the latter. Shooting of the film was completed on 7 December 2017.

Soundtrack
The soundtrack of the film incorporates two songs recorded by Ali Rameez, one for the album Ranfaunu, and one for the album Giritee, sixteen years back. "Dheewaana Mihira Vanee"—a solo version by Rameez and "Aavaa Handhaaney"—a duet with Fazeela Amir, was used in the film since a video for either tracks has not been released earlier. Theme song of the film, "Thiya Loaibaa Dhurah"—sung and composed by Ibrahim Nifar and penned by Ismail Mubaarik—was released on 11 March 2018.

Release and response
Thiya Loaibaa Dhurah was released on 21 April 2018 and opened to a positive response at the box office. In May 2018, it was premiered in Sri Lanka, and played two housefull shows at Mount Lavinia Cinema.

The film received moderate response from critics. Aminath Lubaa from Sun praised the music and story of the film though she opined the performance from the actors could have been better.

References

2018 films
Maldivian romance films
Films shot in Sri Lanka